Diplomatic relations between the Republic of Azerbaijan and the People's Republic of China were established on April 2, 1992. The relations between the two countries have developed smoothly and high-level exchanges have been close. The PRC embassy in Baku openly commends Azerbaijan for supporting its stance on the political status of Taiwan, Tibet's sovereignty, the conflict in Xinjiang, and the suppression of Falun Gong. All political forces have actively advocated strengthening friendly cooperation with China. China was one of the first countries to recognize independence. President Aliyev came to China in August 2008 and May 2014 to attend the opening ceremony of the Beijing Olympic Games and the fourth summit of the Asia Cooperation and Confidence Measures Conference. In March 2005 and December 2015, he twice went to China for state affairs. access. In June 2018, the President of the National Assembly, Assador, visited China. In May 2016, Special Envoy of Chinese Communist Party (CCP) general secretary Xi Jinping, member of the Political Bureau of the CCP Central Committee and Secretary of the CCP Central Political and Legal Affairs Commission Meng Jianzhu visited Afghanistan. In June of the same year, Zhang Gaoli, member of the Standing Committee of the Political Bureau of the CCP Central Committee and Vice Premier of the State Council, visited Azerbaijan.

China-Azerbaijan economic and trade relations have developed smoothly. In 2017, the trade volume between China and Azerbaijan was US$964 million, a year-on-year increase of 27.3%. Among them, China's exports were 387 million US dollars, up 11.9% year-on-year, and China's imports were 577 million US dollars, up 40.1% year-on-year. From January to November 2018, the trade volume between China and Azerbaijan was 1.165 billion US dollars.

In 1999, the two sides held the first meeting of the China-Azerbaijan Intergovernmental Economic and Trade Cooperation Committee and held the sixth meeting in 2016.

The two sides have cooperated smoothly in the fields of education, culture, science and technology, sports, tourism and media. The two sides cooperated in the opening of two Confucius Institutes.

History

1992-2000 
On April 2, 1992, Diplomatic relations between China and Azerbaijan were established. There are strong diplomatic and cultural ties between the two countries.

On March 7–10, 1994, President of Azerbaijan Heydar Aliyev made a work trip to the People's Republic of China. He has met with the Chairman of the People's Republic of China, Jiang Jemin, and Prime Minister Li Peng. 8 agreements were signed between the two countries during the visit. At the meeting, leaders signed a joint statement on the basis of improving the friendly ties between the PRC and Azerbaijan. Several agreements on opening the air route between the two countries, cooperation in the scientific, technical, cultural, medical sphere, television, and tourism fields have also been signed.

On March 8, Heydar Aliyev met with the Prime Minister of the State Council of the People's Republic of China Li Pen.

In addition to political relations, there are also cultural relations between the two eastern countries. According to the agreement on cultural cooperation signed between Azerbaijan and China, an exhibition of works by famous Azerbaijani artist Sattar Bahlulzade was opened at Beijing International Exhibition Center on April 12–21, 1995.

April 17–18, 1996, Deputy Prime Minister of the People's Republic of China Jiang Jemin visited Azerbaijan and met with Heydar Aliyev.

August From 27 to 30, 1997, the delegation headed by Deputy Chairman of the People's Representatives Assembly of the PRC Van Bintsyan paid a visit to Azerbaijan. During the visit, meetings on strengthening economic cooperation between the two countries, further development of relations between the parliaments of Azerbaijan and China were held. The Chinese People's Assembly delegation provided $60,000 in technical assistance to the parliament.

2000-present 
On August 7, 2008, President of Azerbaijan Ilham Aliyev visited China to attend the opening ceremony of the 2008 Summer Olympics in Beijing.

On 25 April 2019, Azerbaijan and China signed a document worth $821 million with the participating co-chair of the Azerbaijan-China Intergovernmental Trade and Economic Cooperation Commission, head of the Eurasia Department of the Ministry of Commerce. The signing ceremony of documents between Azerbaijani and Chinese companies was held within the framework of the “One Belt One Road” international forum in Beijing, China.

On 2 June 2021, in a phone call, Azerbaijani President Ilham Aliyev congratulated CCP general secretary Xi Jinping and wished the Chinese Communist Party (CCP) on its upcoming 100th anniversary of its founding on 1 July 2021.

See also 
 Foreign relations of Azerbaijan
 Foreign relations of China

References 

 
China
Azerbaijan